Sideshow is a novel by Mike Resnick published in 1982.

Plot summary
Sideshow is a novel in which a carnival owner blackmails a company into playing on the interstellar circuit.

Reception
Greg Costikyan reviewed Sideshow in Ares Magazine #14 and commented that "The intrusion of a human scale into a genre whose major appeal is its galactic scale is a tricky task to pull off, and few have done it successfully. Mike Resnick is one such writer."

Reviews
Review by Faren Miller (1982) in Locus, #262 November 1982
Review by Tom Easton (1983) in Analog Science Fiction/Science Fact, May 1983 
Review by Algis Budrys (1983) in The Magazine of Fantasy & Science Fiction, May 1983

References

1982 American novels
American science fiction novels
Signet Books books